Lucile is a 1927 French silent drama film directed by Georges Monca and starring Maryse Dauvray, Georges Gauthier and Jean Lorette.

Cast
 Maryse Dauvray 
 Georges Gauthier
 Jean Lorette 
 Georges Térof
 Gabrielle Robinne

References

Bibliography
 Jay Robert Nash, Robert Connelly & Stanley Ralph Ross. Motion Picture Guide Silent Film 1910-1936. Cinebooks, 1988.

External links 
 

1927 films
French drama films
French silent feature films
1927 drama films
1920s French-language films
Films directed by Georges Monca
French black-and-white films
Silent drama films
1920s French films